Pakajik (also Romanized as Pakājīk; also known as Bīā Jīk, Pagājek, Pagā Jīk, Parch, Pārchī, Payadzhik, Paya Jīk, Pega Jik, Pīkāchīk, and Yakāchīk) is a village in Gowharan Rural District, in the Central District of Khoy County, West Azerbaijan Province, Iran. At the 2006 census, its population was 1,216, in 298 families.

References 

Populated places in Khoy County